Ove Rode (31 August 1867 – 11 July 1933) was a Danish politician, writer, newspaper editor and Minister of Interior Affairs for Det Radikale Venstre.

Biography
As a young journalist, Rode was editor of his own newspaper, København, from 1889 until 1892. He was later hired at the newspaper Politiken, where he was political editor from 1905 to 1913.

He first ran for member of the Folketing—a chamber of the Danish parliament, the Rigsdag—in 1897, and he was a member of the Folketing from 1909 to 1927.

In 1913, he became minister of interior affairs in the Cabinet of Zahle II, and being responsible for interior politics during World War I, he became a controversial figure. With the August laws of 1914, he introduced an until then unseen government control of the supply and cost of a number of goods, intending to counteract the effects of the war.

In 1927, he left politics and became editor-in-chief of Politiken, a position he held until 1933.

He was a son of Margrethe Rode, and a brother of writer Helge Rode.

References

1867 births
1933 deaths
Danish Interior Ministers
Politiken editors
Members of the Folketing
Danish Social Liberal Party politicians
20th-century Danish politicians